Fear Factor: Khatron Ke Khiladi, Darr Lega Class Aur Dega Trass, is the tenth season of Fear Factor: Khatron Ke Khiladi, an Indian reality and stunt television series which was shot in August 2019 and premiered on 22 February 2020, on Colors TV. The series is produced by Endemol Shine India. Filmed in Bulgaria, it is hosted by Rohit Shetty. The season ended on 26 July 2020 with Karishma Tanna declared as the winner and Karan Patel became the 1st runner up. The show's telecast was stopped due to the COVID-19 pandemic from 29 March to 27 June.

Contestants

Elimination chart

 Malishka proxies Shivin due to injury
 Stunt performed with an additional advantage
 Shivin proxies Adaa due to injury
 Due to COVID-19 pandemic, the show dates were postponed for 3 months. Repeat telecast was shown during this period.

  Winner
  1st runner-up
  2nd runner-up
 Finalists
 Ticket To Finale
 Won the stunt
 Lost
 Safe from elimination stunt
 Bottom three
 Saved
 Eliminated
 The contestant was a Wild Card Entry
 Injury/Health Hault
 The contestant quit the show.

Reception 
In its first week, the show was ranked in the second position in the most popular shows in India with Target Rating Point of 8392 impressions as per BARC. The show maintained the second position till the end of 4th week.

Episodes

Guest appearance

References

External links
 
Web Shorts & Episodes

2020 Indian television seasons
10
Colors TV original programming